The 1996 UEFA European Under-21 Championship qualification began in 1994 and finished in early 1996. The final tournament was held in 1996 in Spain.

The 44 national teams were divided into 8 groups (four groups of 5 + four groups of 6). The group winners qualify to the quarterfinals.

Qualifying

Draw
The allocation of teams into qualifying groups was based on that of UEFA Euro 1996 qualifying tournament with several changes, reflecting the absence of some nations:
 Groups 1, 2, 3, 4 and 5 featured the same nations
 Group 6 did not include Northern Ireland, and Liechtenstein, but included England (who did not participate in senior Euro qualification)
 Group 7 did not include Albania
 Group 8 did not include Faroe Islands

Group 1

 qualify as group winners

Group 2

 qualify as group winners

Group 3

 qualify as group winners

Group 4

 qualify as group winners

Group 5

 qualify as group winners

Group 6

 qualify as group winners

Group 7

 qualify as group winners

Group 8

 qualify as group winners

See also
1996 UEFA European Under-21 Championship

1996 UEFA European Under-21 Championship
Qual
UEFA European Under-21 Championship qualification